Murieston Castle is a ruined tower house, dating from the 16th century,  west of West Calder, west of the Murieston Water, at Murieston Castle Farm, West Lothian, Scotland. It is a scheduled monument and between 1971 and 2018 it was a Category B listed building.

History
Murieston Castle had become ruinous by the early 19th century when it was restored around 1824. It has been described as being over-restored, and having the character of a folly. The restoration was for John Keir who bought Wester Murieston in 1819.

Structure
The castle was oblong, the walls being of rubble, two storeys high. At first-floor level there is a roofless turret, corbelled out in the original building. The ground-floor interior has been gutted and it has an earthen floor. There is a fore-stair to the upper storey. A double doorway carries a medallion with arms in spandrel, dated 1824.

References

Castles in West Lothian
Listed castles in Scotland
Ruins in West Lothian
Scheduled Ancient Monuments in West Lothian